Fridrikh Mikhailovich Maryutin (October 7, 1924 – September 9, 2010) was a Soviet football player and manager. He was born in Astrakhan and died in Saint Petersburg. Maryutin played his only game for USSR on July 20, 1952 in a 1952 Olympics game against Yugoslavia.

References

External links
 Profile
Biography of Fridrikh Maryutin 

Soviet footballers
Russian footballers
Soviet Union international footballers
Footballers at the 1952 Summer Olympics
Olympic footballers of the Soviet Union
Soviet football managers
FC Zenit Saint Petersburg players
1924 births
2010 deaths
Association football forwards
Sportspeople from Astrakhan